Norman Partridge (born May 28, 1958) is an American author of horror and mystery fiction.  He has written two detective novels about retired boxer Jack Baddalach, Saguaro Riptide and The Ten Ounce Siesta.  He is also the author of a Crow novel, The Crow: Wicked Prayer, which was adapted in 2005 into the fourth Crow movie, bearing the same name.

Mr. Partridge's 2006 novel Dark Harvest, published in a limited edition of 2000 autographed copies and 24 lettered edition copies by Cemetery Dance Publications, was voted one of Publishers Weekly's 100 Best Books of 2006.  It also won the 2006 Bram Stoker Award for Best Long Fiction, and has been nominated for two more awards in 2007.  Dark Harvest is in film production at MGM Film Group

His short stories are collected in the volumes Mr. Fox and Other Feral Tales, Bad Intentions, and The Man with the Barbed Wire Fists.

Partridge works as the library's evening circulation supervisor at Saint Mary's College of California. He gave a campus reading of Dark Harvest on October 30, 2019.

In October of 2010, Cemetery Dance announced the "Four Days of Halloween" Limited Edition promotional offer, where from October 29, 2010 to November 1, 2010, they would be offering 10/31: The Butcher's Tale by Norman Partridge, setting the print run at however many books were ordered in that window. As of July, 2022, there has been no development on this book, and apparently no plans from Partridge to deliver a manuscript.

Awards, nominations, and honors
Mr. Fox and Other Feral Tales
Won the 1992 Bram Stoker Award for Best Fiction Collection
Nominated for a 1993 Collections World Fantasy Award

Bad Intentions:
Nominated for a 1997 Collections World Fantasy Award

The Man with the Barbed-Wire Fists:
Won the 2001 Bram Stoker Award for Best Fiction Collection

Dark Harvest:
Selected as one of Publishers Weekly's 100 Best Books of 2006.
Won the 2006 Bram Stoker Award for Best Long Fiction.
Nominated for a 2007 World Fantasy Award.
Nominated for a 2007 International Horror Guild Award.

Selected bibliography

Novels
Slippin' Into Darkness (Cemetery Dance Publications, 1994) 
Paperback reprinted by Kensington Books in 1996. 
Wildest Dreams (Subterranean Press, 1998) 
The Crow: Wicked Prayer (Harper, 2000) 
Dark Harvest (Cemetery Dance Publications, 2006) 
Paperback reprinted by Tor Books in 2007.

Jack Baddalach Mystery series
Saguaro Riptide (1997)
 The Ten-Ounce Siesta (1998). Berkeley Publishing Group. pp. 254.

Collections
Mr. Fox & Other Feral Tales (Roadkill Press, 1992) (cover art by Alan M. Clark)
Introduction by Edward Bryant
"Mr. Fox"
"The Baddest Son of a Bitch in the House"
"Black Leather Kites"
"Save the Last Dance for Me"
"Sandprint"
"Vessels"
"In Beauty, Like the Night: A Tale of the Living Dead"
This book was re-released in a revised version in 2005 by Subterranean Press with 11 more short stories and authorial commentary about each story. Early pre-orders also came with the chapbook Dead Men Tell No Tales. The additional stories are:
"The Body Bags"
"Cosmos"
"Stackalee"
"Tooth & Nail"
"The Entourage"
"Kiss of Death"
"Treats"
"Velvet Fangs"
"!Cuidado!"
"When the Fruit Comes Ripe"
"Walkers"
"The Season of Giving"
The re-released Subterranean Press version also came in a 26 copy lettered edition which featured additional material:
"The Oldest Story in the Book"
"At the Battlements of Bannockburn"
"Ten Fingers of Death"
"Style of the Mantis"
"Man, I Just Work Here"
"Wind-Chimes"
"Cutting to the Chase"
"Satan’s Army"
"My Favorite Rejection Slip"

Bad Intentions (Subterranean Press, 1996) 
Introduction by Joe R. Lansdale
"Johnny Halloween"
"Eighty-Eight Sins"
"The Cut Man"
"Dead Celebs"
"'59 Frankenstein"
"Candy Bars for Elvis"
"Styx"
"Wrong Side of the Road"
"Gorilla Gunslinger"
"Dead Man's Hand"
"Apotropaics"
She’s My Witch"
"Bad Intentions"
"Guignoir"
Story Notes

The Man with the Barbed-Wire Fists (Night Shade Books, 2001) 
"Seeing Past the Corners"
"Red Right Hand"
"Coyotes"
"Do Not Hasten to Bid Me Adieu"
"The Man with the Barbed-Wire Fists"
"The Pack"
"Blood Money"
"Last Kiss"
"Blackbirds"
"Wrong Turn"
"Spyder"
"In Beauty, Like the Night"
"Minutes"
"Where the Woodbine Twineth"
"Mr. Fox"
"The Hollow Man"
"Return of the Shroud"
"Tombstone Moon"
"The Mojave Two-Step"
"¡Cuidado!"
"Carne Muerta"
"Bucket of Blood"
"Undead Origami"
"Harvest"
"The Bars on Satan's Jailhouse"
Bibliography

Lesser Demons (Subterranean Press, 2010) 
Available as a trade edition and a 250 copy signed limited edition (with a bonus chapbook short story)
"Second Chance"
"The Big Man"
"Lesser Demons"
"Carrion"
"The Fourth Stair up from the Second Landing"
"And What Did You See in the World?"
"Road Dogs"
"The House Inside"
"Durston"
"The Iron Dead"
A Few Words After

Chapbooks
"Spyder" (1995)
"The Bars on Satan's Jailhouse" (1995)
"Red Right Hand" (1998)
"The House Inside" (2003)
"Styx" (2003)

Anthologies
As editor:
It Came From The Drive-In (1996) - includes Norman Partridge's short story "’59 Frankenstein"

References

20th-century American novelists
21st-century American novelists
American horror writers
American male novelists
1958 births
Living people
American male short story writers
20th-century American short story writers
21st-century American short story writers
20th-century American male writers
21st-century American male writers
Novelists from California
Writers from Vallejo, California